Gyraulus laevis is a small species of freshwater snail, an aquatic pulmonate gastropod mollusc in the family Planorbidae, the ram's horn snails.

Distribution
Found mainly in the northern parts of Europe East to Siberia and north-east Asia. Distribution type: Eurasian Boreo-temperate. The distribution of this species is Holarctic:
 Germany - critically endangered (vom Aussterben bedroht)
 British Isles, Great Britain and Ireland
 For more countries see Fauna Europaea.

Habitat
This small snail lives on water plants in freshwater. It favours sunny clean and silent shallow water zones with moderately rich vegetation. It is often found in undisturbed waters which are eutrophic but with a rich oxygen contents, Gyraulus laevis is also as a pioneer species (in lake margins that are in the process of becoming land)

Shell description
For terms see gastropod shell. The 1-2.5 x 3.0-4.5 mm shell is nearly planispiral in its coiling. The
shell has 3-4 strongly convex whorls with a deep suture, at the lower side the whorls are in one regular plain and never keeled. The upper side is concave. The colour is horn brown and the surface is shiny, irregularly striated and with no spiral sculpture.

References

External links
Gyraulus laevis at Animalbase taxonomy,short description, distribution, biology,status (threats), images

laevis
Molluscs of Europe
Gastropods described in 1838